Daniel Addo may refer to:

 Daniel Addo (footballer, born 1976), Ghanaian footballer
 Daniel Addo (footballer, born 1987), Ghanaian footballer
 Daniel Ashley Addo (born 1989), Ghanaian footballer
 Daniel Addo (soldier), former chief of the defence staff of Ghana's armed forces

See also
Addo (surname)